Gerhard Liebmann (born 20 April 1970) is an Austrian actor. He appeared in more than fifty films since 1998.

Selected filmography

References

External links 

1970 births
Living people
Austrian male film actors